This article lists the Ministers of Foreign Relations of Uruguay since 1828:

External links 
 Uruguayan Ministry of Foreign Relations: list of former Ministers of Foreign Relations (in Spanish only)

Foreign relations of Uruguay
 
Foreign Relations